Peter James Bryant is an American actor best known for his roles as Bling in the television series Dark Angel and Waldo Weatherbee on the television series Riverdale.

Filmography

Movies

Television

External links

American male film actors
American male television actors
Living people
Place of birth missing (living people)
Year of birth missing (living people)